Open access in India (उन्मुक्त अभिगम) was begun in May 2004, when two workshops were organized by the M S Swaminathan Research Foundation, Chennai. This laid the foundation for the Open Access movement in India. In 2006, the National Knowledge Commission in its recommendations proposed that "access to knowledge is the most fundamental way of increasing the opportunities and reach of individuals and groups". In 2009, the Council of Scientific & Industrial Research (CSIR) began requiring that its grantees provide open access to funded research. In 2011, the Open Access India forum formulated a draft policy on Open Access for India. Currently, the Directory of Open Access Journals lists 326 open access journals published in India, of which 233 have no fees.

Landmarks 
 2006 - India's first institutional mandate of open access adopted by the National institute of Technology, Rourkela.
 2009 - UGC Mandates M. Phil & Ph.D. thesis deposition
 2009 - National Knowledge Commission recommends Open Educational Resources .
2011 - Council of Scientific & Industrial Research (CSIR) constitutes committee for implementation of Open Access policy in CSIR.
2013 - National Repository of Open Educational Resources
 2013 - Indian Council of Agricultural Research (ICAR) adopted Open Access policy for the establishment of Open Access institutional repositories in the ICAR institutes
 2014 - Department of Biotechnology (DBT) and Department of Science and Technology (DST) jointly made funders mandate for Open Access to the research outputs funded by the DBT/DST.
 2017 - Open Access India had developed and submitted a draft 'National Open Access Policy' to the Ministries of Human Resource Development and Science & Technology. 
 2017 - AgriXiv, preprints repository launched by Open Access India with the support of the Centre for Open Science. 
2018 - The "Delhi Declaration on Open Access" in South Asia was issued on 14 February 2018, signed by dozens of academics and supporters.  
2018 - The University Grants Commission's thesis repository, Shodhganga which is in place due to the Ministry of HRD's directives, encourages the authors to tag the submissions with Creative Commons Licence Attribution-NonCommercial-ShareAlike 4.0 International (CC BY-NC-SA 4.0).
2019 - IndiaRxiv, India's preprint repository launched by the Open Access India community.
2019 - Open Access India joins AmeliCA in taking forward the 'non-profit publishing model to preserve the scholarly communications' in India 
2020 - AgriXiv is relaunched as agriRxiv by jointly by the Open Access India and CABI. 
 2020 - Science, Technology and Innovation Policy 2020 (draft) propose to make preprints and post prints available through a central repository.
 2022 - IndiaRiv relaunched using Open Preprint Systems of Public Knowledge Project.
 2022 - The Central University of Haryana adopted Open Access Policy

Forums 
The Open Access India forum was started in 2011 as an online forum and as a community of practice. The members of the community of practice, Open Access India had adapted the PLOS's Open Access logo and modified it to represent it as the Open Access movement in India and had formulated a draft policy on Open Access for India.

Journals
As of April 2022, the Directory of Open Access Journals lists 326 open access journals which are being published from India of which, 233 are having no Article Processing Charges.. Titles include the Indian Journal of Community Medicine, Indian Journal of Medical Research, Indian Journal of Medical Microbiology and Journal of Horticultural Sciences.

Repositories

As of April 2018, there are at least 78 collections of scholarship in India housed in digital open access repositories. They contain journal articles, book chapters, data, and other research outputs that are free to read. The Open Access India with the help of Centre for Open Science had launched a preprint repository for India, IndiaRxiv on 5 August 2019 which had recently crossed 100 records mark. However, it is not accepting the records currently on its OSF but there is an update of resumption on new website. The Open Access India earlier had launched AgriXiv, preprints repository for agriculture and allied sciences which is now currently with CABI as agriRxiv.

See also
 National Digital Library of India
 Internet in India
 Education in India
 Media of India
 Science and technology in India
 Copyright law of India
 List of libraries in India
 Open access in other countries

References

Further reading
 Guttikonda, A., & Gutam, S. (2009). Prospects of open access to Indian agricultural research: A case study of ICAR. First Monday, 14(7). https://doi.org/10.5210/fm.v14i7.2488 

 
 
 
   
 
 
 
  (About National Institute of Science Communication and Information Resources)
  (Includes information about India, Brazil, China, Russia, South Africa)

External links
 
 
 

Academia in India
India
Publishing in India
Science and technology in India
Communications in India